Kerrier was a non-metropolitan district in Cornwall, England, created by the Local Government Act 1972. Elections were held to the new authorities in 1973, and they acted as "shadow authorities" until the handover date. Elections were held on 7 June.
All 18 divisions were up for election, covering 42 seats across single and multiple-member wards.

Results

By Ward 

The electoral division results listed below are in alphabetical order, as described at the time, including numbered divisions.

References

Kerrier
Kerrier District Council elections
1970s in Cornwall